Baldomero Rubiera (24 November 1926 – 2018) was a Cuban gymnast. He competed in eight events at the 1948 Summer Olympics.

References

1926 births
2018 deaths
Cuban male artistic gymnasts
Olympic gymnasts of Cuba
Gymnasts at the 1948 Summer Olympics
Sportspeople from Havana
Pan American Games medalists in gymnastics
Pan American Games gold medalists for Cuba
Pan American Games silver medalists for Cuba
Pan American Games bronze medalists for Cuba
Gymnasts at the 1951 Pan American Games
Gymnasts at the 1955 Pan American Games
Medalists at the 1951 Pan American Games
Medalists at the 1955 Pan American Games
20th-century Cuban people
21st-century Cuban people